The 2015 Campbell Fighting Camels football team represented Campbell University in the 2015 NCAA Division I FCS football season. They were led by third-year head coach Mike Minter and played their home games at Barker–Lane Stadium. They were a member of the Pioneer Football League. They finished the season 5–6, 3–5 in PFL play to finish in seventh place.

Schedule

Source: Schedule

Game summaries

Pikeville

Chowan

at Presbyterian

at Butler

Drake

Marist

at Stetson

Morehead State

at Davidson

at San Diego

Jacksonville

References

Campbell
Campbell Fighting Camels football seasons
Campbell Fighting Camels football